The 2024 Caribbean Series will be the 66th edition of the Caribbean Series, played at LoanDepot Park in Miami sometime in February 2024. This will be the first time since 1991 that the Caribbean Series has been held outside of Latin America as well as the first Caribbean Series to be held at an MLB ballpark. 

The series will bring together the champions of each professional baseball league in the countries that make up the Caribbean Professional Baseball Confederation (Venezuela, the Dominican Republic, Puerto Rico, Mexico, Panama and Colombia).

References

External links 
 Official website (Spanish)

2024
Caribbean Series
Caribbean Series
Caribbean Series
International baseball competitions hosted by the United States